The Queen of Fear is a 2018 Argentine drama film directed by Valeria Bertuccelli, in her directorial debut. It was screened in the World Cinema Dramatic Competition section at the 2018 Sundance Film Festival.

Cast
 Valeria Bertuccelli as Robertina
 Diego Velázquez as Lisandro
 Gabriel Goity as Alberto
 Darío Grandinetti as Robertina's husband
 Mercedes Scápola as Depiladora

References

External links
 

2018 films
2018 drama films
2010s Spanish-language films
Argentine drama films
2010s Argentine films